Kangbao may refer to:

Kangbao County, in Hebei, China
Kangbao Town, county seat of Kangbao County